The province of Nuoro is a province in the autonomous island region of Sardinia, Italy. Its capital is the city of Nuoro.

The province is divided into 74 comuni, the largest of which are Nuoro (36,925 inhabitants), Siniscola (11,492), Macomer (10,043), and Dorgali (8,576). The other comuni are generally not so large, even if Oliena (7,123 inhabitants) and Orosei (7,025) can be considered as well as populated towns.

The province was established in 1927. In 2005, the territory of the Province of Nuoro was substantially reduced as a consequence of the establishment in the island of four new provinces; subsequent administrative reforms have increased its size once again in 2016, through the annexation of 22 out of the 23 communes which made up the short-lived Ogliastra.

Parks located in the province include the National Park of the Gulf of Orosei and Gennargentu.

The Province of Nuoro is one of Southern Europe's least densely populated areas. However, it is known for its high concentration of centenarians and supercentenarians. From 5 March 2001 to 3 January 2002, Antonio Todde, from Tiana, was the oldest man in the world.

Government

List of presidents of the province of Nuoro

References

External links

Official website 

 
Nuoro
1927 establishments in Italy
Nuoro
Blue zones